Yesterday & Today Volume 2 is a compilation album by the progressive bluegrass band Country Gentlemen.

Track listing

 Columbus Stockade Blues (Jimmie Davis, Eva Sargent)
 Girl Behind the Bar (Stanley)
 Man of Constant Sorrow (Stanley)
 Aunt Dinah's Quittin' Party (Traditional)
 Cripple Creek (Traditional)
 Philadelphia Lawyer (Woody Guthrie)
 This Land Is Your Land (Woody Guthrie)
 Lord I'm Coming Home
 Windy and Warm (John D. Loudermilk)
 Doin' My Time (Jimmie Skinner)
 East Virginia Blues (Traditional)
 Over the Hills to the Poorhouse (A.P. Carter)

Personnel
 Charlie Waller - guitar, vocals
 Doyle Lawson - mandolin, vocals
 Bill Emerson - banjo, vocals
 Bill Yates - bass, vocals

References

External links
 http://www.lpdiscography.com/c/Cgentlemen/cgent.htm

The Country Gentlemen compilation albums
1973 compilation albums
Rebel Records compilation albums